Balmoral Mounds (16 TE 12) is an archaeological site of the Coles Creek culture in Tensas Parish, Louisiana. The site has components located both on the east and west sides of US 65 near Bayou Rousset.

Description
The site consists of 3 platform mounds that form an equilateral triangle. Core samples of Mounds A and C suggest they were built at roughly the same time and in single stages

Location

See also
Balmoral, Louisiana
Culture, phase, and chronological table for the Mississippi Valley
Flowery Mound
Ghost Site Mounds
Sundown Mounds

References

External links
 Balmoral Mound

Archaeological sites of the Coles Creek culture
Geography of Tensas Parish, Louisiana
Mounds in Louisiana
7th-century establishments in Coles Creek culture
12th-century disestablishments in Coles Creek culture